Sister Salvation is an album by American jazz trombonist, composer and arranger Slide Hampton which was released on the Atlantic label in 1960.

Reception

Allmusic gave the album 3½ stars.

Track listing 
All compositions by Slide Hampton except as indicated
 "Sister Salvation" - 6:13
 "Just Squeeze Me" (Duke Ellington, Lee Gaines) - 6:30
 "Hi-Fli" (Randy Weston) - 6:06
 "Assevervation" - 5:55
 "Conversation Piece" (aka "Minority") (Gigi Gryce) - 6:53
 "A Little Night Music" - 4:09

Personnel 
Slide Hampton - trombone, arranger
Freddie Hubbard, Ernie Royal (tracks 2 & 4-6), Richard Williams (tracks 1 & 3), Bob Zottola - trumpet
Bernard McKinney - euphonium
Bill Barber - tuba
George Coleman - tenor saxophone, arranger
Jay Cameron - baritone saxophone
Nabil Totah - bass
Pete La Roca - drums
Bill Frazier - arranger

References 

Slide Hampton albums
1960 albums
Atlantic Records albums